Sunny Days is a 2011 Kazakhstani drama film directed by Nariman Turebayev.

Cast
 Inkar Abdrash
 Asel Kaliyeva
 Yuri Radin
 Erlan Utepbergenov

References

External links
 

2011 films
2011 drama films
2010s Russian-language films
Kazakhstani drama films